The 2000 Rolex 24 at Daytona was a Grand-Am Rolex Sports Car Series 24-hour endurance sports car race held on February 5–6, 2000 at the Daytona International Speedway road course. The event was the first round of the inaugural Rolex Sports Car Series season. Victory overall and in the GTO class went to the No. 91 Viper Team Oreca Dodge Viper GTS-R piloted by Olivier Beretta, Karl Wendlinger, and Dominique Dupuy. Victory in the SR class went to the No. 20 Dyson Racing Riley & Scott Mk III piloted by James Weaver, Rob Dyson, Max Papis, and Elliott Forbes-Robinson. Victory in the GTU category went to the No. 56 Haberthur Racing Porsche 996 GT3-R piloted by Luca Drudi, Gabrio Rosa, Fabio Rosa, and Fabio Babini. Finally, the AGT class was won by the No. 84 Comer Racing, Inc. Chevrolet Camaro piloted by John Finger, Doug Mills, Richard Maugeri, Andy McNeil, and Ronald Zitza.

Race results
Class winners in bold.

External links
Official results

Car Information & Images

24 Hours of Daytona
2000 in American motorsport
2000 in sports in Florida